Andrew Park may refer to:
 Andrew Park (animator), English animator
 Andrew Park (theatre director), American theatre director and puppeteer
 Andrew Park (tennis) (born 1980), American former tennis player
 Andrew S. Park, Korean American Methodist theologian
 Andrew T. Park, Allegheny County District Attorney

See also
 Andy Park (disambiguation)
 Andrew Haydon Park, a park on the Ottawa River in the city of Ottawa